Bouyahiaoui may refer to:

Places
 Ali Bouyahiaoui, neighbourhood in Algeria.
 Mohamed Bouyahiaoui Hospital, hospital in Algeria.

People
 Noureddine Bouyahiaoui (born 1955), Moroccan footballer